Campo del Cielo refers to a group of iron meteorites and the area in Argentina where they were found.

The craters are estimated to be four to five thousand years old. They were reported to the general public in 1576, but were already well-known by aboriginal peoples. The craters and surrounding areas contain many fragments of an iron meteorite. In total, approximately 100 tonnes of fragments have been recovered, the most of any meteorite find.

The two largest fragments, the 30.8-tonne Gancedo and 28.8-tonne El Chaco, are among the heaviest single-piece meteorite masses recovered on Earth, following the 60-tonne Hoba meteorite and a 31-tonne fragment of the Cape York meteorite.

History 

In 1576, the governor of a province in northern Argentina commissioned the military to search for a huge mass of iron, which he had heard that natives used for their weapons. The natives claimed that the mass had fallen from the sky in a place they called Piguem Nonralta, which the Spanish translated as Campo del Cielo ("Field of heaven (or the sky)"). The expedition found a large mass of metal protruding out of the soil and collected a few samples, which were described as being of unusual purity. The governor documented the expedition and submitted the report to the General Archive of the Indies in Seville, Spain, but it was quickly forgotten and later reports merely repeated the native legends.

Following the legends, in 1774 Don Bartolomé Francisco de Maguna rediscovered the iron mass which he called el Mesón de Fierro ("the Table of Iron"). Maguna believed that the mass was the tip of an iron vein. The next expedition, led by Rubin de Celis in 1783, used explosives to clear the ground around the mass and found that it was likely a single stone. Celis estimated its mass as 15 tonnes and abandoned it as worthless. He believed that it had formed by a volcanic eruption, rather than being a meteorite. However, he sent samples to the Royal Society in London and published his report in the Philosophical Transactions of the Royal Society. Those samples were later analyzed and found to contain 90% iron and 10% nickel; they were assigned to a meteoritic origin.

  Since the crater field's discovery, hundreds iron pieces have been recovered, weighing from a few milligrams to 34 tonnes. Otumpa, a mass of approximately 1 tonne, was discovered in 1803. A  portion of this mass was taken to Buenos Aires in 1813, then donated to the British Museum. Other large fragments are summarized in the table below. The mass called El Taco was originally , but the largest remaining fragment weighs .

It was extracted in 1980 and, at the time, was estimated to weigh about 37 tonnes. This made it the second heaviest meteorite after the 60-tonne Hoba meteorite, discovered in Namibia. Currently, more than 100 tonnes of Campo del Cielo fragments have been discovered, making it the heaviest set of such finds on Earth.
 
In 1990 an Argentine highway police officer foiled a plot by Robert Haag to steal El Chaco. It was returned to Campo del Cielo and is now protected by provincial law.

In 2016, the largest-known meteorite of the strewn field was unearthed.

The meteorite impact, age and composition 
At least 26 craters make up the Campo del Cielo crater field, the largest being . At least two of the craters contained thousands of small iron pieces. Such an unusual distribution suggests that a large body entered the Earth's atmosphere and broke into pieces, which fell to the ground. Samples of charred wood were taken from beneath the meteorite fragments and analyzed for carbon-14 composition. The results indicate the date of the fall to be around 4,200–4,700 years ago, or 2,200–2,700 years BC. The age is estimated to be 4.5 billion years old, formed as part of the development of our solar system.

The fragments contain an unusually high density of inclusions for an iron meteorite, which may have contributed to the disintegration of the original meteorite. The average composition of the Campo del Cielo meteorites is 3.6 ppm iridium, 87 ppm gallium, 407 ppm germanium, 0.25% phosphorus, 0.43% cobalt, and 6.67% nickel, with the remaining 92.6% being iron.

See also 

 Glossary of meteoritics
 List of impact craters in South America
 Río Cuarto craters
 List of largest meteorites on Earth

References

External links 

 campodelcielo.info

Meteorites found in Argentina
Impact craters of Argentina
Holocene impact craters
Quaternary Argentina
Chaco Province
Santiago del Estero Province